Eric John Holborow  (1918–2009) was a British physician, rheumatologist, and immunologist, known for his pioneering research on autoimmunity.

After education at Epsom College, Eric John Holborow, known as "John" or "EJ", studied medicine at Clare College, Cambridge and St Bartholomew's Hospital, graduating in 1942 MB BChir (Cantab.). In 1942 immediately after qualifying MRCS, LRCP, he joined the RAMC and served (under the command of John Vivian Dacie from 1943 to 1946) in Egypt. Holborow in 1947 joined the Royal Postgraduate Medical School's department of haematology (where Dacie was a senior lecturer) and in 1953 graduated MD.

In 1953 Holborow joined the scientific staff of the MRC Rheumatism Research Unit at the Canadian Red Cross Memorial Hospital in Taplow, Buckinghamshire. He eventually became the director of the Rheumatism Research Unit and worked there until the Unit was closed in 1976.

He was in 1956 a founder member of the British Society for Immunology and in 1959 became the Society's second secretary.

In 1976 the Arthritis and Rheumatism Campaign set up the Bone and Joint Research Unit at the London Hospital Medical College (LHMC) in Whitechapel. Holborow was appointed the head of the Bone and Joint Research Unit and was given a professorial chair in immunopathology. He was a co-editor for The Journal of Immunological Methods and a co-editor with William Gordon Reeves of two editions of Immunology in Medicine: A Comprehensive Guide to Clinical Immunology (London, Academic Press, 1977, 1983). Holborow was elected FRCP in 1978 and was the Bradshaw Lecturer in 1982. He retired in 1983.

He married in 1943. Upon his death in 2009 he was survived by his widow, two sons, a daughter, six grandchildren, and two great-grandchildren.

Selected publications

References

1918 births
2009 deaths
People educated at Epsom College
Alumni of Clare College, Cambridge
Alumni of the Medical College of St Bartholomew's Hospital
20th-century English medical doctors
British immunologists
British rheumatologists
Fellows of the Royal College of Physicians
Royal Army Medical Corps officers